Federal Highway 125 (Carretera Federal No. 125) is a Federal Highway of Mexico that runs from Veracruz south across the Sierra Madre Oriental to just north of the Pacific Ocean in Oaxaca. Federal Highway 125 is split into three segments: the first segment travels from Conejos, Veracruz in the north to Fortín de las Flores in the south. The second segment travels from Tehuacán, Puebla in the north to Huajuapan de León, Oaxaca in the south. The third segment travels from Yucudaa, Oaxaca to Pinotepa Nacional, Oaxaca.

References

125